Gonzenbach is a surname. Notable people with the surname include:

Carl Arnold Gonzenbach (1806–1885), Swiss painter
Laura Gonzenbach (1842–1878), Swiss fairy tale collector